Nobody's Girl (lit. Amongst Family, 1893) is a novel by Hector Malot. The story was later translated into English as The Story of Perrine by Gil.

There is a Japanese anime series, Perrine Monogatari based on the novel. It is part of the World Masterpiece Theater collection, which also adapted Nobody's Boy, another of Malot's novels, into an anime called Remi, Nobody's Girl.

Plot
The story follows 13-year-old Perrine. She first arrives in Paris with her ill mother in a cart with very few possessions pulled by a donkey, Palikare. She stays at the Guillot field, where her mother gets really ill. In order to have enough money for medicine, Perrine sells Palikare, with the help of Grain-of-Salt ( the owner of Guillot fields) to La Rouquerie. Despite all the care, Perrine's mother dies, leaving Perrine as an orphan, so Perrine sets off on foot, almost penniless, to find her relatives in Maraucourt. 
She makes a friend, Rosalie, who shows the Factories of Mr. Vulfran, and lets her lodge at her grandmother's for a little money. Perrine refrains from letting anybody in Maraucourt know her real name, and uses the pseudonym Aurelie til the end of the book. As Perrine is one of the few people who can speak English, except for Mr. Benndite, she soon comes close to Mr. Vulfran, who eventually lets her stay with him. As the book progresses Mr. Vulfran learns to love Perrine, and it is only in the end where he finds out that Perrine is his own granddaughter.

External links
  Nobody's Girl (En Famille) fulltext 

1893 French novels
Novels by Hector Malot
Novels about orphans
Fictional French people
Fictional French people in literature